Jigsaw camouflage is the colloquial term for a series of camouflage patterns used by the Belgian Armed Forces between 1956 and 2022 and subsequently adapted in several other countries.

History

After its adoption by the Belgian military in 1956, it was originally mainly used by Paracommando units. It was subsequently adopted across the Belgian Armed Forces underwent several variations from the original design. The final temperate variation was implemented in 2016. 

A distinct jigsaw camouflage pattern inspired by the Belgian precedent was adopted by certain units of the Forces Armées Zaïroises in Zaire, a former Belgian colony, into the 1990s. Similar variants were also produced elsewhere in Africa.

As part of the introduction of the Belgian Defence Clothing System, it was announced that the pattern would be phased out by the Belgian Armed Forces in favour of Multicam from November 2022. The contract was awarded to Sioen and Seyntex with Crye Precision under a budget of €410 million. The pattern is held by an American patent.

Patterns
The main Belgian four-tone temperate version was officially designated as "Woodland". A desert version was also produced.

A Burundian variant with darker colors and a version with blue colorways were used by the Burundian military and police.

Users

Current
 : Standard camouflage of the Belgian Armed Forces. Being replaced from November 2022 by Multicam in G4 clothing style.

Former
 : Known to be used by "certain local units" under Belgian colonial rule and briefly after independence by Burundian National Army.
 : Belgian-based jigsaw camo used by Chadian Army in 1980s.
 : Formerly used by Force Publique and Armée Nationale Congolaise.
 : Belgian woodland and desert versions used by the Luxembourg Armed Forces during the War in Afghanistan.

References

Bibliography
 

Camouflage patterns
Belgian Land Component
Military equipment introduced in the 1950s